Leather root is a common name for several genera of legumes and may refer to:

Hoita
Orbexilum
Psoralea